Martin Kavanagh may refer to:

 Martin Kavanagh (historian) (1895–1987), teacher and historian
 Martin Kavanagh (hurler) (born 1994), Irish hurler